Monank Patel (born May 1, 1993) is an Indian-born American cricketer and the captain of the United States national cricket team. He has played for the United States since 2018 as a right-handed top-order batsman and wicket-keeper.

Personal life
Patel was born on May 1, 1993, in Anand, Gujarat, India. He played for Gujarat at under-16 and under-18 level. Patel received a green card in 2010 and moved to the United States permanently in 2016, settling in New Jersey.

International career
In August 2018, he was named in the United States' squad for the 2018–19 ICC World Twenty20 Americas Qualifier tournament in Morrisville, North Carolina. He was the leading run-scorer in the tournament, with 208 runs in six matches.

In October 2018, he was named in the United States' squad for the 2018–19 Regional Super50 tournament in the West Indies. He made his List A debut for the United States against Combined Campuses and Colleges on October 6, 2018. On October 22, in the match against Jamaica, Patel scored the first century by an American batsman in the tournament. He finished as the leading run-scorer for the United States in the competition, with 290 runs in seven matches.

Later the same month he was named in the United States' squad for the 2018 ICC World Cricket League Division Three tournament in Oman. Ahead of the tournament, he was named as the player to watch in the United States' squad. In the United States' opening match of the tournament, against Uganda, he scored 107 runs.

In February 2019, he was named in the United States' Twenty20 International (T20I) squad for their series against the United Arab Emirates. The matches were the first T20I fixtures to be played by the United States cricket team. He made his T20I debut for the United States against the United Arab Emirates on 15 March 2019.

In April 2019, he was named in the United States cricket team's squad for the 2019 ICC World Cricket League Division Two tournament in Namibia. The United States finished in the top four places in the tournament, therefore gaining One Day International (ODI) status. Patel made his ODI debut for the United States on 27 April 2019, against Papua New Guinea, in the tournament's third-place playoff.

In June 2019, he was named in a 30-man training squad for the United States cricket team, ahead of the Regional Finals of the 2018–19 ICC T20 World Cup Americas Qualifier tournament in Bermuda. The following month, he was one of five players to sign a 12-month central contract with USA Cricket. In August 2019, he was named in the United States' squad for the Regional Finals of the 2018–19 ICC T20 World Cup Americas Qualifier tournament.

In November 2019, he was named in the United States' squad for the 2019–20 Regional Super50 tournament. He was the leading run-scorer for the United States in the tournament, with 230 runs in eight matches. In June 2021, he was selected to take part in the Minor League Cricket tournament in the United States following the players' draft.

In August 2021, Patel was named in the United States' squad for the 2021 Oman Tri-Nation Series. In the opening match of the series, Patel scored his first century in ODI cricket.

In October 2021, he was named as the captain of the American squad for the 2021 ICC Men's T20 World Cup Americas Qualifier tournament in Antigua.

References

External links
 

1993 births
Living people
American cricketers
Indian cricketers
People from Anand district
United States One Day International cricketers
United States Twenty20 International cricketers
Indian emigrants to the United States
Cricketers from New Jersey
American people of Gujarati descent
American sportspeople of Indian descent